On January 21, 2008, Petrobras announced the discovery of the Júpiter Field, a huge natural gas and condensate (very light oil) field which could equal the Tupi oil field in size (5-8 billion BOE).

Description 
The main reservoir of Júpiter is the pre-salt Guaratiba Group.

See also 

 Campos Basin
 Iara oil field
 Iracema oil field
 Tupi oil field

References

Bibliography 
 

Oil fields of Brazil
Santos Basin
Petrobras oil and gas fields
Galp Energia